Kee House may refer to:

Kee House (Palo Alto, California), listed on the National Register of Historic Places
Kee House (Chandler, Oklahoma)